Tienlun Dam is a concrete gravity dam on the Dajia River in Heping District, Taichung, Taiwan. Built from 1952 to 1956, the dam is the fourth in a cascade of hydroelectric dams along the Dajia River, located upstream from the Ma'an Dam and downstream of the Kukuan Dam.

It supplies water to a power station consisting of one 105 megawatt (MW) turbine and four 22.5 MW turbines for a capacity of 195 MW, generating 557 million kilowatt hours per year.

See also

 List of power stations in Taiwan
 List of dams and reservoirs in Taiwan
 Electricity sector in Taiwan

References

1956 establishments in Taiwan
Dams in Taichung
Dams completed in 1956
Gravity dams
Hydroelectric power stations in Taiwan